Luminary Group LLC is a licensing and intellectual property management company founded in Indiana in 2006. They represent the derivatives of several personalities, including Babe Ruth, Vince Lombardi, Jesse Owens, Cy Young, Buddy Holly, Honus Wagner, Satchel Paige, Bob Denver and others. 

The company has allied with the Screen Actors Guild in filing amicus briefs in support of Right of Publicity recognition throughout the United States, and has contributed to legislative efforts concerning the Right of Publicity. The company's founder, Jonathan Faber, teaches a course on the Right of Publicity at Indiana University's Robert H. McKinney School of Law.  

Luminary Group's personnel have been cited in publications such as Billboard Magazine and the American Bar Association's national magazine. The company recently licensed Lombardi, the Broadway production based on Vince Lombardi, on behalf of the Family of Vince Lombardi.

The company also provides expert witness testimony, valuations, or consulting in relation to lawsuits concerning intellectual property rights.
 Drake
 50 Cent
 Indianapolis Motor Speedway (IMS)
 Uma Thurman v. Lancôme
 Nikki Sixx v. Vans, Thrasher
 Zooey Deschanel v. Steve Madden Shoes, Kohl's
 Oscar de la Hoya and Golden Boy Promotions
 Curtis Publishing and the Saturday Evening Post Society, Inc.
 Estate of Arthur Bemelmans v. DIC Enterprises

Other Luminary Group clients include Johnny Unitas, Major Taylor, Art Donovan, Raymond Berry and Sam Snead.

References

Intellectual property law firms
Companies based in Indiana